is a Japanese politician who served as the leader of the Constitutional Democratic Party of Japan from its formation in 2017 until 2021. A member of the House of Representatives in the Diet since 1993, he served as Chief Cabinet Secretary and Minister of Economy, Trade and Industry in the Democratic Party of Japan (DPJ) government from 2010 to 2012.

Following the CDP's poor performance in the 2021 general election, Edano announced on 2 November his intention to resign as leader of the party, triggering a leadership election.

Early life 
Edano was born in Utsunomiya on 31 May 1964. He is named after Japanese progressive liberal political figure Yukio Ozaki, who Edano's father admired. Edano graduated from Tohoku University with a degree in law, and passed the Japanese bar examination at the age of 24.

Political career 
In the 1993 general election, at the age of 29, Edano joined Morihiro Hosokawa's Japan New Party and won a seat in the Saitama 5th district. He participated in the formation of the DPJ in 1996.

As a legislator, Edano played a role in the government response to the HIV-tainted blood scandal of 1995 and the financial industry reorganization of 1998.

Edano was appointed as the secretary general of the DPJ in March 2010 when it was the country's ruling party. Katsuya Okada, the former Foreign Minister, subsequently replaced him in September 2010.

Chief Cabinet Secretary 

In January 2011, Edano became Chief Cabinet Secretary in the Kan Cabinet. In March 2011, he was temporarily appointed head of the Foreign Ministry.

In the wake of the 2011 earthquake and tsunami in northeastern Japan, he was the face of the government efforts to combat the aftermath, frequently appearing on television to talk about the problems at the two reactor facilities in Fukushima. Because of the frequency of his appearances, Twitter users concerned with his health were prompted to post messages asking him to get some sleep.

Minister of Economy, Trade and Industry 
As economy minister in the Noda Cabinet, Edano approved the introduction of feed-in tariffs on 18 June 2012, whereby a percentage of energy use fees are used to subsidize (a shift to) renewable energy.

Post-cabinet

Edano left the Cabinet following the DPJ's defeat in the December 2012 general election, but retained his seat representing the Saitama 5th district.

Edano was named secretary general of the DPJ in September 2014. He retained this position in the Democratic Party following the merger of the DPJ with the Japan Innovation Party in March 2016.

DP leader Renho resigned in July 2017 after the party suffered a poor result in the 2017 Tokyo assembly election. With the liberal wing of the party losing clout due to the influx of conservative Japan Innovation Party members after the merger, Edano only managed to garner 40% of the points up for grabs in the election. In an attempt to unify the party, the freshly-elected leader Maehara appointed Edano as the deputy president.

Constitutional Democratic Party 

Prime Minister Shinzo Abe made a surprise announcement for a snap election on 25 September 2017, only three weeks after the DP leadership election. With the party unprepared and in disarray, Maehara was scrambling to find a way to shore up support for the party. At the same day as Abe's election announcement, Tokyo Governor Yuriko Koike launched a new conservative party called Kibō no Tō (Party of Hope). Seeing Koike's high popularity at that time as a potential asset, Maehara coordinated with Koike on DP candidates' nominations for the election. Koike agreed to endorse DP candidates and Maehara effectively disbanded the party in order to allow the candidates run under the Kibō banner. However, despite Maehara's request, Koike imposed an ideological filter that effectively barred liberal-leaning members of the DP, such as Edano, from joining Kibō. Edano then decided to form a separate party to house liberal DP members rejected by Koike.

On 2 October 2017, Edano founded the Constitutional Democratic Party as a split from the Democratic Party, becoming the party's leader. Despite being formed only less than three weeks before the election, the CDP ran a very efficient campaign with a principled platform and used social media in a level unprecedented in Japanese politics. Edano led the party to become the second largest party in the Diet in the general election.

He won the 2020 Constitutional Democratic Party of Japan leadership election.

Political views 
Edano has described himself as both liberal and conservative, believing the labels do not conflict with one another. He supports separate surnames for married couples.

Family 
Edano is married and has twin sons.

References

External links

  

|-

|-

|-

|-

|-

|-

|-

|-

|-

|-

1964 births
Democratic Party of Japan politicians
Foreign ministers of Japan
Government ministers of Japan
Japan New Party politicians
Liberalism in Japan
Living people
Japanese social liberals
Members of the House of Representatives from Saitama Prefecture
People from Utsunomiya, Tochigi
Tohoku University alumni
Noda cabinet
21st-century Japanese politicians
Constitutional Democratic Party of Japan politicians